Cameron Lake, Ontario is one of the Kawartha Lakes and is a lake bordering the town of Fenelon Falls and is part of the Trent–Severn Waterway. The lake lies between locks 34 & 35 on the Trent–Severn Waterway.

Much of the side of the lake is taken up with housing and is a popular place to live. The town of Fenelon Falls is found between Sturgeon Lake and Cameron Lake. The lake is popular with boaters and fisherman. Fish found in the lake include:
smallmouth bass,
largemouth bass,
walleye (pickerel) and
muskie (occasionally tiger muskellunge).

In the lake are found the Lakers Islands (a.k.a. Boyd and Rathbun islands). The Burnt River and Rosedale River are tributaries of the lake.

Cameron lake is not eutrophic because it has a high flushing rate which counteracts its high phosphorus loading.

See also
List of lakes of Ontario

External links
Fenelon Falls District Chamber of Commerce
www.VisitFenelonFalls.com

Lakes of Kawartha Lakes